Desiree Luke is a Trinidadian former cricketer who played as a right-arm off break bowler. She appeared in eight One Day Internationals for the West Indies between 1993 and 1997. She played domestic cricket for Trinidad and Tobago.

Luke made her One Day International at the 1993 World Cup in England. She appeared in five of her team's seven matches, and took four wickets, with a best of 3/27 against England. Luke was retained in the West Indian squad for the 1997 World Cup in India. In three matches at that tournament, she took six wickets – 2/12 against Sri Lanka, 1/24 against India, and 3/57 against New Zealand.

References

External links
 
 

Living people
Date of birth missing (living people)
Year of birth missing (living people)
West Indian women cricketers
West Indies women One Day International cricketers
Trinidad and Tobago women cricketers